Isocossus rufipecten is a moth in the family Cossidae. It is found on Borneo and Sumatra. The habitat consists of lowland areas and lower montane forests.

The wingspan is 28–30 mm.

References

Natural History Museum Lepidoptera generic names catalog

Cossinae
Moths described in 1986
Moths of Asia